The Thompson Belt, also referred to as the Thompson Nickel Belt, is an Archean and early Proterozoic geologic feature in Manitoba, Canada. It contains gneiss related to deformation of the Trans-Hudson orogeny.

References

Geology of Manitoba
Archean geology
Proterozoic geology
Precambrian North America
Proterozoic North America